José Enrique Doger Guerrero (born 19 August 1957) is a Mexican politician affiliated with the Institutional Revolutionary Party (PRI). From 2005 to 2008, he served as mayor of the city of Puebla after serving as rector of his alma mater, the Meritorious Autonomous University of Puebla. He currently serves as Deputy of the LXII Legislature of the Mexican Congress representing Puebla.

References

1957 births
Living people
Politicians from Puebla
Institutional Revolutionary Party politicians
21st-century Mexican politicians
Meritorious Autonomous University of Puebla alumni
Members of the Congress of Puebla
Heads of universities and colleges in Mexico
Deputies of the LXII Legislature of Mexico
Members of the Chamber of Deputies (Mexico) for Puebla